The 1965 Baltimore Orioles season involved the Orioles finishing 3rd in the American League with a record of 94 wins and 68 losses.

Offseason 
 November 28, 1964: Merv Rettenmund was signed as an amateur free agent by the Orioles.

Regular season

Season standings

Record vs. opponents

Notable transactions 
 April 24, 1965: Bob Saverine and cash were traded by the Orioles to the Houston Astros for Don Larsen.
 June 8, 1965: 1965 Major League Baseball Draft
 Frank Tepedino was drafted by the Orioles in the 3rd round of the 1965 Major League Baseball Draft.
 Lowell Palmer was drafted by the Orioles in the 23rd round, but did not sign.
 July 24, 1965: Carl Warwick was purchased by the Orioles from the St. Louis Cardinals.

Roster

Player stats

Batting

Starters by position 
Note: Pos = Position; G = Games played; AB = At bats; H = Hits; Avg. = Batting average; HR = Home runs; RBI = Runs batted in

Other batters 
Note: G = Games played; AB = At bats; H = Hits; Avg. = Batting average; HR = Home runs; RBI = Runs batted in

Pitching

Starting pitchers 
Note: G = Games pitched; IP = Innings pitched; W = Wins; L = Losses; ERA = Earned run average; SO = Strikeouts

Other pitchers 
Note: G = Games pitched; IP = Innings pitched; W = Wins; L = Losses; ERA = Earned run average; SO = Strikeouts

Relief pitchers 
Note: G = Games pitched; W = Wins; L = Losses; SV = Saves; ERA = Earned run average; SO = Strikeouts

Farm system 

LEAGUE CHAMPIONS: Stockton, Tri-City

Notes

References 

1965 Baltimore Orioles team page at Baseball Reference
1965 Baltimore Orioles season at baseball-almanac.com

Baltimore Orioles seasons
Baltimore Orioles season
Baltimore Orioles